Comair Flight Services (often referred to as CFS) is a South African business aviation company established in 2007 and is based in Johannesburg, South Africa. Its head office is based at Lanseria International Airport.

History
Originally established in 2007 the company was first named Corporate Flight Services but in 2012 Comair General Aviation Holdings acquired a stake in the company and it was re-branded as Comair Flight Services, retaining the initials "CFS". CFS is a licensed non-scheduled air service (charter) operator and holds a worldwide Air Operator Certificate from the South African Civil Aviation Authority as well as Domestic and International Air Service Licences.

Fleet
As of May 2018 the CFS charter fleet included the following aircraft types:

The company provides executive and safari air charter services, outsourced flight department and aircraft management services as well as flight / trip support and aircraft sales services.

References

Airlines of South Africa
Airlines established in 2007
Charter airlines